The 1993 Calder Cup playoffs of the American Hockey League began on April 12, 1993. The twelve teams that qualified, four from each division, played best-of-seven series for division semifinals and division finals. The highest remaining seed received a bye for the third round while the other two remaining teams played a best-of-three series, with the winner advancing to play the bye-team in a best-of-seven series for the Calder Cup. The Calder Cup Final ended on May 30, 1993, with the Cape Breton Oilers defeating the Rochester Americans four games to one to win the first Calder Cup in team history.

Cape Breton's Bill McDougall won the Jack A. Butterfield Trophy as AHL playoff MVP. He also set or tied five individual AHL playoff records during Cape Breton's Calder Cup run. He set the records for most points in one playoff (52; 26 goals, 26 assists), most goals scored in one playoff (26), and the most goals scored in one game with 5 in Cape Breton's 8-2 win over St. John's in game 4 of the Atlantic division final. McDougall also set the record for most assists in one playoff with 26, which has been matched twice since then. He also scored 7 points (4 goals, 3 assists) in game 2 of the semifinal against Springfield, tying an AHL record for most points in one playoff game. Cape Breton also tied an AHL playoff record by scoring 85 goals during the 1993 playoffs, and they managed to do it in one fewer game than the Sherbrooke Canadiens, who scored 85 goals during the 1987 Calder Cup Playoffs.

Playoff seeds
After the 1992-93 AHL regular season, 12 teams qualified for the playoffs. The top four teams from each division qualified for the playoffs. The Binghamton Rangers finished the regular season with the best overall record.

Atlantic Division
St. John's Maple Leafs - 95 points
Fredericton Canadiens - 87 points
Cape Breton Oilers - 84 points
Moncton Hawks - 78 points

Northern Division
Providence Bruins - 94 points
Adirondack Red Wings - 81 points
Capital District Islanders - 80 points
Springfield Indians - 64 points

Southern Division
Binghamton Rangers - 124 points
Rochester Americans - 87 points
Utica Devils - 77 points
Baltimore Skipjacks - 68 points

Bracket

In each round the team that earned more points during the regular season receives home ice advantage, meaning they receive the "extra" game on home-ice if the series reaches the maximum number of games. For the Semifinal round, the team that earned the most points during the regular season out of the three remaining teams receives a bye directly to the Calder Cup Final. There is no set series format due to arena scheduling conflicts and travel considerations.

Division Semifinals 
Note: Home team is listed first.

Atlantic Division

(A1) St. John's Maple Leafs vs. (A4) Moncton Hawks

(A2) Fredericton Canadiens vs. (A3) Cape Breton Oilers

Northern Division

(N1) Providence Bruins vs. (N4) Springfield Indians

(N2) Adirondack Red Wings vs. (N3) Capital District Islanders

Southern Division

(S1) Binghamton Rangers vs. (S4) Baltimore Skipjacks

(S2) Rochester Americans vs. (S3) Utica Devils

Division Finals

Atlantic Division

(A1) St. John's Maple Leafs vs. (A3) Cape Breton Oilers

Northern Division

(N2) Adirondack Red Wings vs. (N4) Springfield Indians

Southern Division

(S1) Binghamton Rangers vs. (S2) Rochester Americans

Semifinal

Bye
(S2) Rochester Americans receive a bye to the Calder Cup Final by virtue of having earned the highest point total in the regular season out of the three remaining teams.

(A3) Cape Breton Oilers vs. (N4) Springfield Indians

Calder Cup Final

(S2) Rochester Americans vs. (A3) Cape Breton Oilers

See also
1992–93 AHL season
List of AHL seasons

References

Calder Cup
Calder Cup playoffs